Ekamra-Bhubaneswar is a Vidhan Sabha constituency of Khordha district, Odisha, India.

This constituency includes 5 Gram panchayats (Basuaghai, Itipur, Tikarapada, Dhauli and Sisupal) of Bhubaneswar block and Ward No.12, 14, 15 and 30 to 34 and Ward No. 38 to 47 of Bhubaneswar.

Elected members

Only One election was held in 2009.
Elected member from the Ekamra-Bhubaneswar constituency is:

2019: (114): Ashok Chandra Panda (BJD)
2014: (114): Ashok Chandra Panda (BJD)
2009: (114): Ashok Chandra Panda (BJD)

Election Results

2019

2014

2009
In 2009 election, Biju Janata Dal candidate Ashok Chandra Panda defeated Indian National Congress candidate Pratap Kumar Jena by a margin of 43,450 votes.

Notes

References

Assembly constituencies of Odisha
Khordha district